Ryo Mabuchi (馬淵 良, 12 March 1933 – 22 November 2021) was a Japanese diver who won the 10 platform event at the 1958 Asian Games. Together with his wife Kanoko Tsutani-Mabuchi, he competed in the springboard and platform at the 1956 and 1960 Summer Olympics and placed 12th–18th. His daughter Yoshino Mabuchi also became an Olympic diver.

Mabuchi died of emphysema on 22 November 2021, at the age of 88.

References

1933 births
2021 deaths
Olympic divers of Japan
Divers at the 1956 Summer Olympics
Divers at the 1960 Summer Olympics
Japanese male divers
Asian Games medalists in diving
Divers at the 1958 Asian Games
Asian Games gold medalists for Japan
Medalists at the 1958 Asian Games
Sportspeople from Ishikawa Prefecture
Deaths from emphysema
20th-century Japanese people